CLAP may refer to:

 CLAP!... El lugar de tus sueños, a children's television series from Mexico
 Child Labour Programme of Action
 Local Committee for Supply and Production (CLAP), a government-sponsored food distribution program in Venezuela
 CLever Audio Plug-in, an audio effect software API

See also
 Clap (disambiguation)